Bothropasin (Bothrops jararaca venom metalloproteinase) is an enzyme. This enzyme catalyses the following chemical reaction

 Cleavage of His5-Leu, His10-Leu, Ala14-Leu, Tyr16-Leu and Phe24-Phe in insulin B chain

This endopeptidase is present in the venom of jararaca snake (Bothrops jararaca).

See also 
 Atrolysin A

References

External links 
 

EC 3.4.24